Caleb Stephenson (born December 21, 1998), better known by his stage name Caleb Steph, is an American rapper from Newport News, Virginia.

Career 

Caleb started making music at the age of 12. When he was 16 he started taking music more seriously as a career. Caleb began uploading his music onto SoundCloud in early 2015. In 2017, he receives the attention of Dirty Hit and ends up signing with them.

In February 2019, Caleb released his debut single "Can I Talk" under Dirty Hit. The following month he released "Trapped", produced by Sha Money XL, as the lead single to his debut project "Bellwood Product". The EP was released on April 12, 2019, with the "Black Boy" music video dropping the same day. After releasing his standalone self-produced single "Therapy Sessions" in February 2020, Caleb announced his departure from Dirty Hit, citing misrepresentation and unfair treatment.

Artistry
Steph has listed Clipse, Pharrell Williams, Jay-Z, MF DOOM, Joey Bada$$, J Dilla, Bow Wow, The Notorious B.I.G., Kendrick Lamar, and Kanye West as some of his influences.

Discography

EPs
Bellwood Product (2019)

Guest appearances

Music videos

References

External links 
 
 
 
 

1998 births
Living people
African-American male rappers
American male rappers
Dirty Hit artists
Musicians from Virginia
Songwriters from Virginia
Rappers from Virginia
21st-century American rappers
21st-century American male musicians
American male songwriters